The old Pacífico Power Plant is a former power station belonging to the Madrid Metro. On 11 April 2013 the Directorate General of Historical Heritage of the Community of Madrid declared it a Bien de Interés Cultural. It is known by the name of its most important components, three massive diesel ship engines, and the Pacífico Metro station nearby.

Built in the 1920s, the Nave de motores de Pacífico was an active electric power station until the 1950s. It is now an exhibition and event space. Its architect was Antonio Palacios.

At present it is, along with Chamberí station, which is over 5 km away, one of the two sites of Platform 0, the visitor centre of the Madrid Metro.

References 

 This article was created from a translation of the equivalent article on the Spanish-language Wikipedia

External links 
 
 A View of Madrid: An Electrifying History

Buildings and structures in Pacífico neighborhood, Madrid
Former power stations in Spain
Madrid Metro